The Shell Seekers is a 1989 Hallmark Hall of Fame made-for-television drama film based on the 1987 novel of the same name by Rosamunde Pilcher and starring Angela Lansbury. The film aired on ABC on December 3, 1989 in the U.S. and on ITV on December 21, 1989 in the UK; it was later reaired on CBS on January 31, 1993.

Cast
Angela Lansbury as Penelope Keeling
Irene Worth as Dolly Keeling
Sam Wanamaker as Richard
Patricia Hodge as Olivia
Anna Carteret as Nancy
Sophie Ward as Antonia
Denis Quilley as Cosmo
Serena Gordon as Annabel
Michael Gough as Roy Brookner

See also
The Shell Seekers (2006)

References

External links

Hallmark Hall of Fame episodes
British television films
Films directed by Waris Hussein
Films based on British novels
Television shows based on British novels
ITV television dramas
Television shows produced by Central Independent Television
Television series by ITV Studios
1980s English-language films
American television films
American drama films
1980s American films